The Syriac Heritage Museum is a museum in Erbil, in the Kurdistan Region of Iraq.

The museum is one of the most significant museums in the city of Erbil. It is located within the Citadel of Erbil, which is itself a UNESCO World Heritage Site, and within the Christian neighbourhood of Ankawa.

The museum received permission from the Kurdistan Regional Government to begin construction in 2009 and it opened in 2015. The museum includes a model of the Ankawa neighbourhood as it was from the 1920s to 1950s.

The museum's collection of East Syriac manuscripts includes liturgical books, poetry, prayers, and apocryphal literature. The collection has been digitised in partnership with the Centre Numérique des Manuscrits Orientaux (CNMO). 

The museum's director, David Nadhir Dinkhan, told Rudaw English that “This museum is one of the most important museums in the Middle East because the Iraqi Christians are a minority and their history is being lost... We must try to preserve our history.”

References

Museums in Erbil
Assyrians in Iraq
Assyrian culture